Coleophora lativalva is a moth of the family Coleophoridae. It is found in China.

References

lativalva
Moths described in 1998
Moths of Asia